Hoancă may refer to several villages in Romania:

 Hoancă, a village in Sohodol Commune, Alba County
 Hoancă, a village in Vidra Commune, Alba County